The New Zealand dream (or the Kiwi dream) centres on the acquisition of a family house on a quarter-acre section, with at least one motor vehicle. The New Zealand dream resembles the Australian Dream. For many New Zealanders this dream could also include a pleasure boat, a bach and a holiday at the beach.

The New Zealand dream of acquiring a family home was supported by government policies from the late-nineteenth century through much of the twentieth century, although housing affordability has become a political issue, with limited measures to alleviate rising house prices.

An alternative to this New Zealand dream is "smart growth". The smart-growth concept has no quarter-acre section, no family house and no car. People live in small apartments and use public transport. Smart growth commonly occurs in countries with little free land (such as Hong Kong).

Nation building

Children 

When New Zealand and Australian couples have children they show a very strong preference for family housing (Figure 1). Australian research shows 85% of people who live in apartments would rather live in a house.

American families also prefer family houses, with studies showing that Americans living in multi-family dwellings (apartments etc.) have less children, lowering the demand for schools 
.  One hundred typical
homes generate an average of 54.7 school-aged
children; but multifamily homes generate
only about two thirds the students, with 36.7 school-aged children per
100 households. Apartment households have much lower incomes than those living in family houses and are more likely to suffer from poverty related problems such as overcrowding.

Studies have shown that fertility is highest among couples living in single-family houses and lowest among those residing in apartments. Experts claim that shortages of family housing can cause low birth rates. “Some have suggested that, like laboratory specimens, Italians have responded to their ever-more-crowded-suburbs and cramped apartments by curbing procreation”. Children “aren't wanted in the condominia (apartments), in public places where they can disturb”. “Houses are bigger in the U.S. and generally more available. That may help explain why Americans have more babies”.

Using a scatterplot (Figure 2) has the advantage that cultural effects are average out, revealing the underlying effect of housing on fertility rates. The correlation value (R=0.81) indicates that there is a strong positive correlation between family housing and fertility rates. Advanced countries that have mostly apartments are typically producing only 2/3rds of the children of countries that have mostly family housing.

Having children sustains culture and is good for the economy. Overall Anglo countries have enough children to be approximately sustainable. New Zealand and the United States produce a slight surplus of children, while Ireland, Australia and the UK have modest deficits.

Skilled migration 

New Zealand has a demand for more skilled workers. There is a limited supply of highly skilled migrants available and competition between countries. Housing is one of the factors affecting migration. "Access to affordable and suitable housing is an indicator of positive settlement in
society, and home ownership is an indicator of economic wellbeing and represents
an intention of long-term settlement". To attract highly skilled migrants New Zealand must have desirable living conditions, otherwise they will go somewhere else, such as the United States.

The United Kingdom is by far New Zealand's most important source country of skilled migrants. British studies show that only 2% of British citizens want to live in a low rise apartment, and only 1% in a high rise apartment block. The vast majority prefer to live in a house.

British people are also very fond of spending time in the garden, with more than 70% claiming that it improves their quality of life, and half (48%) of whom felt it was the most enjoyable activity above watching TV (33%) and shopping (14%). A third of Brits also believe that gardens are romantic and can boost their love lives.

New homes 

Over time Kiwi homes are becoming larger and more luxurious. While old homes were mostly box-shaped bungalows, new houses are architecturally more complex, creating houses that are more individualistic and aesthetically pleasing. Popular extras can include a rumpus room (kids playroom), walk-in wardrobes, walk-in kitchen pantries, more bedrooms and extra bathrooms.

New homes have more insulation and those built in the South Island must use double glazing. By 2025 New Zealand intends to increase the share of renewable electricity production from the current 70% to over 90%. All new wood-fires are required to be very efficient and the number of homes using efficient heat pump technology is growing rapidly. “Creating more efficient houses is a triple win for New Zealanders’, our health, our environment and our power bills” (Helen Clark Prime Minister 1999–2008).

The floor area of new dwellings built in New Zealand is extremely variable ranging from as little as 30 m2 for a small apartment to more than 500 m2 for a large house. The average floor area is approximately 200 m2, similar to new American  and Australian homes. The housing indicator value of new homes (=150)  is higher than for the existing stock (see  Figure 2 above), which may cause fertility rates to gradually rise over the coming decades.

Motor vehicles 
The production of affordable motor vehicles has enabled the development of a suburban lifestyle culture, which combines the advantages of city life, with the luxury of ample living space.

In New Zealand ownership of a motor vehicle is regarded by many as a rite of passage, representing the important transition from adolescence to being an independent adult.

International statistics show that New Zealanders have one of the highest rates of motor vehicle ownership in the world (Figure 5). Toyota is the most popular make, while Holden Commodore is the most popular model.

See also
European dream
American dream
Australian Dream
The Half Gallon Quarter Acre Pavlova Paradise, a light hearted and satirical book about New Zealand culture

References 

New Zealand culture